The Serbia national under-17 football team represents Serbia in international football at this age level and is controlled by the Football Association of Serbia, the governing body for football in Serbia.

Competitive record

European U-16/U-17 Championship record

*Denotes draws include knockout matches decided on penalty kicks.

Current squad
 The following players were called up for the 2023 UEFA European Under-17 Championship qualification matches.
 Match dates: 4 and 7 November 2022
 Opposition: vs.  and 
Caps and goals correct as of: 29 May 2022, after the match against

Former squads 
 2018 UEFA European Under-17 Championship – Serbia
 2017 UEFA European Under-17 Championship – Serbia
 2016 UEFA European Under-17 Championship – Serbia
 2011 UEFA European Under-17 Championship – Serbia
 2008 UEFA European Under-17 Championship – Serbia
 2006 UEFA European Under-17 Championship – Serbia and Montenegro
 2002 UEFA European Under-17 Championship – FR Yugoslavia

Coaches

See also
 UEFA European Under-17 Championship
 Serbia national football team
 Serbia national under-19 football team
 Serbia national under-21 football team

References

External links
 Football Association of Serbia 

European national under-17 association football teams
U